Otto's may refer to:

 Otto's encyclopedia, the largest encyclopedia written in Czech
 Otto's Pub & Brewery, State College, Pennsylvania, United States
 Otto's Sausage Kitchen, Portland, Oregon, United States
 Otto's sportive lemur